Peracchi's nectar bat (Lonchophylla peracchii) is a species of nectar-feeding bat in the family Phyllostomidae. It was first described from the Atlantic Forest in southeastern Brazil.

Description
The discovery of this species as distinct from Lonchophylla bokermanni has meant that the latter is restricted to a small area of the Cerrado, and might be endangered due to habitat destruction.

Bat species in the genus Lonchophylla feed on nectar and differ from fruit-eating bats by having a long, extensible tongues and elongated skulls and muzzles, adapted to their feeding behaviour. L. peracchii is distinguished from L. bokermanni by its fur color and ear shape; the Cerrado species has a grayer hue and shorter, rounder ears.

References

Further reading
Teixeira, Tiago Souto Martins, et al. "First record of Lonchophylla peracchii Dias, Esbérard and Moratelli, 2013 (Chiroptera, Phyllostomidae) in São Paulo state, Southeastern Brazil." Oecologia Australis 17.3 (2013).

Lonchophylla
Bats of Brazil
Endemic fauna of Brazil
Fauna of the Atlantic Forest
Critically endangered animals
Critically endangered biota of South America
Mammals described in 2013